Trnovo may refer to the following places:

Bosnia and Herzegovina 
 Trnovo, Republika Srpska, a town and municipality
 Trnovo, Federation of Bosnia and Herzegovina, the rural part of the same pre-war municipality, presently in the Sarajevo Canton
 Trnovo, Šekovići, a village in Republika Srpska

Bulgaria 
 Veliko Tarnovo, or Tarnovo, a city
 Malko Tarnovo, a town

Greece 
 Prasino, a village known before 1955 as Trnovo
 Tyrnavos, a municipality in Thessaly

Montenegro 
 Trnovo, Bar in Bar Municipality

North Macedonia 
 Trnovo, Bitola, a village in Bitola municipality
 Trnovo, Gostivar, a village in Gostivar municipality
 Trnovo, Kriva Palanka, a village in Kriva Palanka Municipality

Slovakia 
 Trnovo, Martin, a village in Martin District

Slovenia 
 Trnovo, Ljubljana, a district of Ljubljana
 Trnovo, Nova Gorica, a village in the Municipality of Nova Gorica

See also 
 Tarnovo
 Trnova (disambiguation)
 Turnovo (disambiguation)